North Wilkesboro Speedway is a short oval racetrack located on U.S. Route 421, about  east of the town of North Wilkesboro, North Carolina, or 80 miles north of Charlotte. It measures  and features a unique uphill backstretch and downhill frontstretch. It has previously held races in NASCAR's top three series, including 93 Winston Cup Series races. The track, a NASCAR original, operated from 1949, NASCAR's inception, until the track's original closure in 1996. The speedway briefly reopened in 2010 and hosted several stock car series races, including the now-defunct ASA Late Model Series, USARacing Pro Cup Series, and PASS super late models, before closing again in the spring of 2011. It was re-opened in August 2022 for grassroots racing and will host the 2023 NASCAR All-Star Race and a NASCAR Craftsman Truck Series race, with further renovations planned after the events.

History

Before the speedway
Years before the 1948 founding of NASCAR, Wilkes County and the surrounding areas were known as the moonshine capital of America. The local economy was pushed toward liquor after the Great Depression had stripped the profitability of farming and the region's undulating topography offered places to hide liquor stills during the Prohibition Era. Its location in the foothills of the Appalachian Mountains was also convenient for distillers and distributors of moonshine. North Wilkesboro native and NASCAR driver Benny Parsons recalled of the era "Trust me, there was nothing to do in the mountains of North Carolina back in the 30s, 40s, and 50s.  You either worked at a hosiery mill, a furniture factory, or you made whiskey."

Early years
In 1945, Enoch Staley attended a stock car race in South Carolina sponsored by Bill France. Enoch was inspired by the races and was impressed by the large crowds attending the new sport, so he decided to build a track in his native Wilkes County, and he asked France to promote the races and assist with their operation.

Enoch and his partners, Lawson Curry, Jack Combs, and Charlie Combs, purchased farmland near North Wilkesboro and began building an oval racetrack. When their initial investment of $1,500 was exhausted, they were forced to amend the original design of the track, hence the completed track was not a perfect oval. The front stretch was left with a downhill slope, and the backstretch had an uphill slope. Construction was completed in late 1946.

North Wilkesboro Speedway opened its doors on May 18, 1947, as a dirt track. France promoted the first official event as a modified race, including heat races and a feature race. While an attendance of about 3,000 people was expected, a crowd in excess of 10,000 was there to see one of the famous Flock brothers win the race.

On October 16, 1949, North Wilkesboro Speedway held the eighth and final race of the 1949 NASCAR Strictly Stock Division. Kenneth Wagner won the first Cup pole at the track with a speed of 57.563 mph on the dirt surface. A total of 22 drivers competed in the race. Bob Flock, in his Bob Christian-owned 1949 Oldsmobile, passed Bill Blair's fading Cadillac with 20 laps to go and won by about 100 yards over Lee Petty. At the end of the day Robert "Red" Byron walked away as the first NASCAR champion.

1950s
North Wilkesboro carried a reputation as one of the fastest short-tracks in auto racing in the late 1940s and 1950s. In 1950, speeds reached 73 mph at the track, compared to the next fastest short-track, Charlotte Speedway, where top speeds only reached 66 mph. Most of the fans in the early years of the sport saw the track as a great venue to watch races between the legendary racers of the time. Racing at North Wilkesboro was intense and physical.

The 1950 Wilkes 200 was the second Grand National Series race held at North Wilkesboro Speedway. Twenty-six cars entered the race. Twenty-one-year-old Fireball Roberts qualified with a lap speed of 73.266 mph on the dirt track for his first ever Grand National pole, but engine problems dropped him out of the running. Fonty Flock started in the third position and led the most laps in the race with 104, but engine troubles also ended his day. Ultimately, Leon Sales led the last eight of the 200 laps to become the victor,  the fourth NASCAR driver to win an event in his debut race. Jack Smith finished second after leading 55 laps.

After hosting only one NASCAR event in 1949 and one in 1950, the track began running two Grand National Series events per year in 1951 (with the exception of 1956, when only one race was held; the track was being prepared for pavement). One race was held in the spring, normally in late March or early April, and another was held in the fall, normally in late September or early October. In 1957, Stanley had the 5/8-mile track paved.

The Wilkes 200 in 1952 turned into a battle between brothers. Two sets of brothers competed in the race, and they took the top four spots at the finish. The Flock brothers (Fonty Flock and Tim Flock) were strong, but the Thomas brothers (Herb Thomas and Donald Thomas) had the better outcome. Herb Thomas, driving his 1952 "Fabulous" Hudson Hornet, won the pole, led 192 of the 200 laps, and grabbed the victory. Fonty Flock led the first eight laps and finished the race second. Donald Thomas, also in a 1952 "Fabulous" Hudson Hornet, finished third, and Tim Flock finished fourth. Eleven of the twenty-seven cars entered in the race finished. Six of the top nine positions were driving Hudson Hornets.

Herb Thomas started on the pole for the 1953 Wilkes 200 with his record-setting qualifying speed of 78.424 mph on the dirt surface. Outside pole sitter Tim Flock led the first 100 laps before experiencing engine problems. Curtis Turner took the lead on lap 101 and continued the lead until his car also succumbed to engine troubles nine laps later. Thomas in his number 92 Hudson Hornet only lead 18 laps in the race but ended the race by taking his third consecutive win at North Wilkesboro. Starting from the third spot, Dick Rathmann led 70 laps and finished behind Herb Thomas. Fonty Flock managed to work his way up from the fourth starting position to the front and led three laps before dropping back and finishing third.

Pole sitter Buck Baker ran 78.288 mph to grab the pole for the 1953 Wilkes 160. Baker ran strong and led the most laps in the race with 80 out front before falling back into sixth position at the finish. Speedy Thompson led 25 laps, and Fonty Flock led 37. Turner led a total of 18 laps. At the end of the race, Thompson finished two laps ahead of second-place Flock. Thompson's win ended Herb Thomas and his Hudson Hornet's three-race winning streak at North Wilkesboro.

At the 1954 Wilkes County 160, Gober Sosebee won the pole with a lap speed of 78.698 mph. Sosebee led a race-high 112 laps but finished in 12th position, eight laps down. The only other leader was Rathmann, who led 48 laps. Rathmann blew a tire while leading, with three laps to go, and still managed to finish and win the race. Herb Thomas finished some 20 seconds behind in second place.

In the 1954 Wilkes 160, Hershel McGriff won the pole with a qualifying speed of 77.612 mph. He and Rathman were the only leaders of the race; McGriff led 74 laps, and Rathman led 83. The race was called three laps early because of a serious crash involving Lou Figaro; his car flipped, and the roof caved in. Figaro was transported to a hospital in Winston-Salem, but he died the following day from a skull fracture and brain damage suffered in the crash. McGriff was declared the winner. It was his final victory and his last Grand National race for 17 years.

Dink Widenhouse won his only career Grand National Series pole at the 1955 Wilkes County 160. Engine problems, however, landed Widenhouse out of the race. Outside pole sitter Baker led all 160 laps, but by the last lap Rathmann was glued to Baker's bumper, still charging. Rathmann's final charge off of turn four came up three feet short of stealing the victory. It was the closest finish in series history up to that time. Local native Junior Johnson ran in his first Grand National race, at North Wilkesboro.

In 1956, the Wilkes County 160 was the only Grand National Series race of the season, and it was the last race on dirt at North Wilkesboro. Junior Johnson's 1956 Pontiac started from the pole and led the first 17 laps before engine problems sidelined him. Outside pole qualifier Thompson took over the lead from there until fuel line problems on lap 114 forced him out of the race. Tim Flock led the final 46 laps, earning his first win at North Wilkesboro. After the race, Flock announced to Carl Kiekhafer that this would be the last time he would drive one of Kiekhafer's cars. Billy Myers was the runner-up.

The Wilkes County 160 in 1957 was dominated by the Pete DePaolo Fords. DePaolo entered five 1957 Fords in the race, and they all finished in the top six positions. Fireball Roberts put his DePaolo Ford on the pole with a qualifying speed of 81.5 mph. It was the first time the pole sitter had a speed over 80 mph. Roberts was the only driver to lead during the race, leading all 160 laps. Roberts won the race without making a single pit stop. DePaolo's other drivers were second-place finisher Paul Goldsmith, third place Ralph Moody, fourth place Marvin Panch, and sixth place Allen Adkins. Buck Baker's was the only non-Depaolo car in the top six. He finished in fifth place.

The Wilkes 160 of 1957 was Junior Johnson's first race after spending 11 months in jail for his moonshining activities. It was also his only start of the 1957 Grand National Series season. Fireball Roberts won the pole with a lap speed of 81.64 mph. Jack Smith passed Banjo Matthews with ten laps to go, holding off Lee Petty for the victory. Tragedy struck on lap 47 when Tiny Lund's axle snapped. One of the wheels broke loose, hitting spectators. One spectator was injured, and another, William R. Thomasson, was killed.

The NASCAR Convertible Series ran two races at North Wilkesboro. In 1957, Ken Rush won the pole and led the first 21 laps before Glen Wood took the lead for the next 42 laps. Paul Goldsmith took the lead on Lap 64 and led the rest of the 160-lap race. In 1958, Roz Howard won the pole but never led a lap. Billy Myers took the lead on lap one and continued until Lap 82 when he was passed by Gwyn Staley. Billy Myers retook the lead on Lap 119 and lead the rest of the race.

In 1959 North Wilkesboro's spring race, the Wilkes County 160, was renamed the Gwyn Staley 160 in memory of Enoch Staley's younger brother. Gwyn Staley was killed in a convertible race at Richmond 12 days before the running of the Wilkes County 160. The race remained in Gwyn Staley's name until 1978. Lee Petty won the inaugural Gwyn Staley 160, His first North Wilkesboro win, driving a Petty Enterprises No. 43 car. It was his only victory driving a No. 43 car, a number later made famous by his son Richard Petty.

1960s
Through the 1960s and 1970s the NASCAR Grand National Series began focusing on bigger, faster, and longer tracks. Like other short tracks in NASCAR at the time, crowd capacity and purses were small compared to the larger tracks. Over time, Staley and Combs attempted to keep the facility modern and on pace with the growth of the sport. The west grandstand was rebuilt with chair-type seats rather than the old bare concrete slabs. New larger restroom facilities were built, and the south grandstand was expanded. A garage facility was also built within the track, which at the time was rare for short-track venues. But the main focus was on keeping ticket prices affordable. Food and beverage prices were kept low, and event parking and camping were always free. As long as profits covered maintenance costs, Staley was satisfied with the income of the track.

In the Gwyn Staley 160 of 1960, Junior Johnson beat 21 other drivers for the pole position with a lap speed of 83.860 mph. Glen Wood overtook Johnson to lead the first lap, but Johnson had the race under control and led the next 145 laps. Lee Petty moved up from the eighth starting position to challenge Johnson late in the race. With 14 laps remaining, Johnson and Petty made contact. Johnson's car was sent spinning into the guardrail. Petty lead the final 14 laps to win his third straight race at North Wilkesboro. The crowd of 9,200 pelted Petty with bottles, rocks, and debris after his win; he had done their local hero wrong. When Petty took the microphone in Victory Lane to explain his side of the story, the crowd began jeering. Rex White finished second, and Wood placed third. Ned Jarrett finished fourth under the alias John Lentz.

The length of the fall race in 1960 was increased from its usual 160 laps / 100 miles to 320 laps / 200 miles, thus it became known as the Wilkes 320. Speeds increased immensely from the previous record, 1.83 seconds quicker than any previous qualifying lap (86.806 to 93.399 mph). White posted the fastest qualifying lap and dethroned Petty from his three-race winning streak at North Wilkesboro. Johnson finished about half a lap behind White in second place.

In the 1961 running of the Gwyn Staley 400, Johnson recorded another pole, this time by 0.57 seconds better than the previous track record, with his qualifying time of 23.52 (95.660 mph). Johnson led all of the 62 laps he ran before transmission problems forced him out of the race. Fred Lorenzen led the next 61 laps until engine problems took him out of the running. And Turner led 56 laps before experiencing problems as well. 1960 Grand National champion Rex White, who started on the outside pole, led the remaining 221 laps and won the race. Tommy Irwin started the race in sixth position and finished the Gwyn Staley 400 two laps behind White. Richard Petty followed in third place. Fireball Roberts, in a Pontiac owned by Smokey Yunick, finished fourth (ten laps down), and Johnny Allen, who crashed out of the race on his 387th lap, still finished in fifth place. Only 12 of the 25 cars that entered the race were running at the finish of the first 400-lap edition of the Gwyn Staley race.

In the 1963 Wilkes 400, Lorenzen captured his third straight pole at the track by breaking his own record with a lap time of 23.30 seconds / 96.566 mph. Richard Petty entered the race in an attempt to become the first driver to win four consecutive races at North Wilkesboro. But he experienced engine problems and lasted only 45 laps into the race. Lorenzen led 58 laps, but came up short of victory, six seconds behind winner Marvin Panch. Panch did not start the 1963 season until halfway through because he had nearly died in a crash while testing a Maserati at Daytona that February. Panch, in a Wood Brothers car, started third and led 131 laps in the race. Holman-Moody took the next three spots in the final rundown, with Lorenzen second, Nelson Stacy third, and Roberts fourth. Stacy started fourth and led 56 laps, while Roberts started from the outside pole and led the most laps with 155.

The track was repaved just prior to the Gwyn Staley 400 in 1964, and the resulting lack of traction wreaked havoc. Roberts,  Baker, Buddy Arrington, and G.C. Spencer all crashed through the wooden guardrail in the first and second turns in Saturday's practice and qualifying. Roberts was unable to start the race because his Ford had been so heavily damaged. Lorenzen won the pole and led 368 laps on the way to the win.

Johnson was the pole sitter for the 1965 Gwyn Staley 400, with a qualifying time and speed of 22.27 seconds / 101.033 mph, breaking his own record by 0.06 seconds. Panch was leading the race when a blown tire caused him to crash with 11 laps remaining. Johnson assumed the lead from there and won his third of 13 wins in 1965. Johnson lead during most of the race, 356 laps in total. Bobby Johns in a Holman-Moody Ford finished in the runner-up position, seven seconds behind Johnson. Finishing third, one lap down, was Jarrett. Jarrett had led 20 laps early in the race. Dick Hutcherson, in his Holman-Moody Ford, finished seven laps off the pace in fourth place, and Panch finished fifth. Panch led on three occasions during the race for a total of 24 laps.

In the Wilkes 400 of 1965, Lorenzen won the pole and led the first 190 laps before engine problems forced him out of the race on lap 219. Johnson took the lead from the fading Lorenzen to pick up his 50th and final Grand National Series victory by two laps over Cale Yarborough. Only 16 of the 35 cars that entered the race were running at the finish.

Jim Paschal started the 1966 Gwyn Staley 400 from the pole position with a record lap time and speed of 21.91 sec / 102.693 mph. Paschal led 308 laps and won by six laps over G.C. Spencer, the largest margin of victory at North Wilkesboro in a Grand National Series race. David Pearson started on the outside pole, and despite losing an engine with 18 laps to go he finished third. Wendell Scott finished fourth (22 laps down), and Clarence Henly Gray finished fifth (25 laps down). Only 14 of the 37 cars entered in the race were running at the finish. Richard Petty was the only driver besides Paschal to lead any laps in the race. He led 92 laps before falling back to finish 11th (53 laps down).

Darel Dieringer completely dominated the 1967 Gwyn Staley 400, driving for Johnson. Dieringer got the pole with a lap of 21.50 seconds / 104.693 mph and lead all 400 laps. He was the first driver to win a Grand National Series race of over 250 miles while leading from start to finish. He lapped the whole field twice at one point. Dieringer took the checked flag after he ran out of gas in turn four of the last lap and coasted to the finish line. This was Dieringer's last Grand National victory. Cale Yarborough, driving the No. 21 Wood Brothers Ford, finished second, one lap behind Dieringer. A 20-lap qualifying race to make the field was won by Clyde Lynn.

In the Wilkes 400 of 1967, Richard Petty achieved an historic tenth straight win, his 27th win of the season, at North Wilkesboro. Prior to the start of the race, Petty's car had a flat tire, but he was able to recover and win by two laps over pole winner Dick Hutcherson. Only 15 of the 35 cars that started the race were able to finish.

1970s
Three drivers entered the 1970 Wilkes 400 in a very close points race. Bobby Isaac was just ahead of James Hylton, and Bobby Allison was close behind. But Richard Petty, who was out of the points because of a shoulder injury suffered at Darlington in May, was considered the favorite to win the race. Isaac started from the pole for a record-tying fourth consecutive time, matching Fred Lorenzen and Herb Thomas with a qualifying lap time of 21.346 seconds / 105.406 mph. Fans were given quite a show as Isaac and Petty exchanged the lead a total of 11 times throughout the race. Isaac, in the Nord Krauskopf's K&K Insurance Dodge, led 179 laps and took the win by six car lengths over Petty. Petty, who had started the race in third position led the most laps in the race with 216. Bobby Allison started fourth and finished fourth behind his brother, Donnie Allison. And Hylton finished fifth at the end of day. Isaac advanced to become the 1970 Winston Cup Champion at season's end, with Allison being the runner-up in points.

Bad weather in 1971 caused the Wilkes 400 to be postponed to November 21. Due to the Grand National Series' struggling car counts, cars from NASCAR's Grand American Series were allowed to run in this race. Charlie Glotzbach broke the track record in qualifying at 20.919 seconds / 107.558 mph. It was the first lap ever run under 21 seconds at  North Wilkesboro, ending Bobby Isaac's run of five consecutive poles at the track. Tiny Lund, driving a 1970 Camaro, qualified sixth and led just seven laps on his way to the victory. Lund also won another race driving the Camaro that season at Hickory. Glotzbach finished second, six seconds behind Lund, after leading 76 laps in the race. Richard Petty started from the outside pole and led 306 laps to finish third. Dave Marcis finished fourth, two laps down, and Benny Parsons rounded out the top five. Bobby Allison was the only other driver to lead, running 11 laps out front before losing an engine prior to the half.

The Wilkes 400 in 1972 was one of the wildest finishes in NASCAR Winston Cup Series history. Buddy Baker won the pole in the No. 71 K&K Insurance Dodge owned by Nord Krauskopf, but he only led the first lap of the race. Richard Petty and Bobby Allison swapped the lead for the rest of the race, beating and banging each other for the win. At times was more of a demolition derby than a race. Both cars were destroyed by the end, with Allison's car noticeably smoking. This was the peak of the Petty-Allison rivalry. Petty was declared the winner, but in Victory Lane, a fan tried to attack him, but he was defended by his helmet-wielding brother, Maurice Petty. This was Richard Petty's last of 137 wins in a Plymouth.

In the Gwyn Staley 400 of 1973, Bobby Allison landed on the pole with a qualifying lap of 21.077 seconds / 106.750 MPH. Richard Petty qualified on the outside pole, and in dominating fashion he led 386 laps, winning by over four laps. It was Petty's tenth career win at North Wilkesboro and his 151st career NASCAR victory. Benny Parsons led six laps and finished second. Buddy Baker finished third in the No. 71 K&K Insurance Dodge owned by Nord Krauskopf. Allison lead seven laps and finished fourth in the race. Cecil Gordon rounded out the top five finishers. Yvon DuHamel, a top AMA road racer from Quebec, drove a Mercury prepared by Junie Donlavey and finished in tenth place in his only career Cup race. Twenty of the 30 cars that entered the race were running at the finish.

In the Wilkes 400 of 1973 Bobby Allison, driving for his own No. 12 Coca-Cola team, won the pole position. He and Richard Petty led most of the race, Allison with 161 and Petty with 222. As Petty led the race late, Allison pitted and got fresh tires on a late pit stop, running down Petty and passing him on the final lap. It was considered as one of the most exciting races ever at North Wilkesboro Speedway.

In 1975 the NASCAR Baby Grand Series, later known as Goody's Dash Series, ran its first race at North Wilkesboro, with a win by Dean Combs. Thirty-seven races were run at the track from 1975 to 1984,1986-1987, and 1995–1996. Dean Combs had the most wins at the track with 15 victories.

In the Gwyn Staley 400 of 1977, Cale Yarborough became the first driver to win a NASCAR Winston Cup Series race on his birthday. Neil Bonnett beat Yarborough for the pole, but in the race Yarborough led 320 laps on the way to his birthday victory. Only the top three, Yarborough, Richard Petty and Benny Parsons finished on the lead lap.

In the Wilkes 400 of 1978, Darrell Waltrip won the pole in his No. 88 Gatorade DiGard team Chevrolet. Waltrip led the first 381 laps of the 400-lap race. But with 19 laps remaining, Yarborough passed Waltrip and took the win. Yarborough and Waltrip were the only drivers to finish on the lead lap in the 27-car field. This ninth win of the season for Yarborough virtually locked his third straight NASCAR Winston Cup Series championship driving for car owner Junior Johnson.

In the Northwestern Bank 400 of 1979, Benny Parsons won the pole. Richard Petty led the most laps with 211, but it was Bobby Allison who passed Petty and led the final 47 laps. The suspension on Allison's No. 15 Ford collapsed as he crossed the finish line on the final lap of the race, leading to a smokey victory lap as the car threw sparks. But by that time he had already won and was headed to Victory Lane. Dale Earnhardt tied for fourth, his best finish at that point in his career.

The Holly Farms 400 in 1979 was the first time the fall race had a sponsor. Holly Farms would be the name of the track's fall races from this event until the track's final race in 1996. The race was scheduled to be run September 30, but heavy rains and worms seeping onto the track surface plagued the entire weekend. So the race was rescheduled for the next available weekend, October 14.  Earnhardt broke the 20-second barrier during qualifying and claimed the pole position. With a new asphalt surface on the track, 14 drivers ended up topping the previous qualifying record. Bobby Allison led the most laps in the race with 175, and Waltrip led 104. After Waltrip bumped Allison out of the lead, Waltrip was wrecked on Lap 311, when Allison put him into the wall. Waltrip began crowding out Allison under the caution before officials black-flagged him. Wilkes County local, Parsons, ended the day in Victory Lane after leading the final 92 laps. It was Parsons' first and only win at his hometown track.

1980s
During the 1980s the track was noticeably lagging behind other speedways on the NASCAR circuit, but the fans were more interested in the great racing action between the legendary drivers. Enoch's focus was more on the fans' enjoyment rather than on building large suites and new facilities. Attendance and total purse for races at the track were the lowest in NASCAR, but the events continued to sell out and attract more fans each year.

In the 1981 Northwestern Bank 400, Dave Marcis, driving an unpainted car, won the pole with a lap record of 19.483 sec / 115.485 mph on the newly repaved track. The lap was 0.241 seconds faster than the previous record set by Dale Earnhardt one year earlier. A 22-year-old newcomer, Mark Martin, made his NASCAR Winston Cup Series debut with a quick qualifying run, starting fifth. But he ended up dropping out 166 laps into the race with rear end problems and finished 27th. Bobby Allison was up front, leading the most laps with 186. Marcis stayed up front and led 123 laps but fell off the pace late in the race when his tires wore out. Richard Petty took the lead and led the final 62 laps for his 194th career win. This was Petty's 15th and final win at North Wilkesboro, the most Cup wins at the track. It was also Petty's 107th and final win on a short track. The top five finishers behind Petty were Allison, Darrell Waltrip, Marcis, and Harry Gant.

Darrell Waltrip dominated the Holly Farms 400 of 1981. He started on the pole, leading 318. He lapped the field on the way to the win, beginning a streak of five straight wins at the track. Bobby Allison finished second, one lap down after leading 76 laps. Other leaders in the race were Jody Ridley leading four laps, Dave Marcis with one lap, and Richard Petty with one.

The Northwestern Bank 400 of 1982 was ESPN's first broadcast at North Wilkesboro Speedway. Bob Jenkins and Ned Jarrett called the race, with Ron Kendrick as the pit reporter. They broadcast every North Wilkesboro race afterward until the final race there in the fall of 1996. Bobby Hillin Jr., at 17 years old, made his first career start and set the record for the youngest driver (A 1998 rule change raised the minimum age in NASCAR to 18, meaning this record is unlikely to be broken) to start a NASCAR Winston Cup race. Darrell Waltrip won the race from the pole, leading 345 laps.

The 1982 Holly Farms 400 was a total domination by Darrell Waltrip and the Junior Johnson team. Waltrip started the weekend by gaining his third straight pole at the track with a qualifying lap of 19.761 sec / 113.860 mph. He led 329 laps in the race. Bobby Allison was the only driver who could stay close to the No. 11 team. As the only other leader in the race, Allison led 71 laps but was forced out by engine problems after 141 laps. Only Waltrip and Harry Gant finished the race on the lead lap. It was Waltrip's third straight NASCAR Winston Cup Series win at North Wilkesboro.

In the spring of 1983, NASCAR ran its first Busch race at North Wilkesboro. Tommy Ellis won the pole with a qualifying speed of 116.692 mph. Ellis led the first 15 laps before being passed by Butch Lindley. Sam Ard got the lead from Lindley on Lap 34 and led the rest of the 200-lap race. Only ten of the 23 cars finished the race. That fall, Phil Parsons won the pole for the second Busch race. Jack Ingram led a race-high 126 laps, but Tommy Ellis took the win. Only one event was held in 1984, with Sam Ard winning his final Busch race. Tommy Houston won the pole in 1985 for the last Busch race, with Jack Ingram taking the win.

Darrell Waltrip and Junior Johnson enjoyed a big win in the 1983 Holly Farms 400. It was Waltrip's fifth straight win at the track and Johnson's 100th career NASCAR Winston Cup Series win as an owner, which just happened to take place at his home track within ten miles of his home and farm. Waltrip got the pole and led 252 laps on the way to victory. Dale Earnhardt was runner-up in the race with 134 laps out front.

The Northwestern Bank 400 of 1984 was dominated by Ricky Rudd, who got the pole and led 290 laps. But at the end of the race, Tim Richmond had a better pit stop to beat Ricky Rudd out of the win. Richmond's victory broke Darrell Waltrip's five-race winning streak at North Wilkesboro.

In the 1986 First Union 400, Geoffrey Bodine started on the pole. On Lap 85, Trevor Boys crashed out of the race and blocked the entrance to Pit Road, but no caution flag was thrown. Instead, a wrecker was sent out on the bottom of the track to haul Boys out of the way under green-flag conditions. Dale Earnhardt won the race and led 195 laps, followed by Ricky Rudd in second place with 102.

The Holly Farms 400 of 1988 was a rough race. Ricky Rudd led 154 laps, and Dale Earnhardt led 107. A beating and banging match started between them, and NASCAR sent them both to the rear of the field with less than 40 laps to go. For the remainder of the race they continued to beat and bang on each other. On the last lap, Geoffrey Bodine gave Rusty Wallace a shot and drove around him in Turn One. But when the two got around to Turn Three, Wallace returned the shot and passed Bodine for the win.

The 1989 First Union 400 was the first NASCAR Winston Cup Series race for Goodyear radial tires. Dale Earnhardt won the race on the Goodyear tires after Rusty Wallace grabbed the pole on Hoosier bias ply tires. Earnhardt led 296 out of 400 laps. In the end, Earnhardt and Alan Kulwicki battled it out hard for the last couple of laps until Kulwicki ran up the track trying to pass Earnhardt on the outside with four laps left.

In the 1989 Holly Farms 400, Dale Earnhardt entered the race only 35 points behind Rusty Wallace for the NASCAR Winston Cup Series championship with four races left. The race was originally scheduled for October 1, but rain caused a two-week postponement. Earnhardt got the pole position because inclement weather had washed out the qualifying runs. This is the only Cup Series race at North Wilkesboro to start without qualifiers. Earnhardt dominated the race, leading 343 laps. On the final restart on lap 398, Earnhardt led Ricky Rudd, Geoff Bodine, Terry Labonte, and Mark Martin. Rudd was in pursuit of Earnhardt on the last lap going into the first turn. He went low, and Earnhardt tried to keep a tight line through the corner to hold the lead. They made contact and both cars went spinning, as Geoff Bodine went around to grab  the win by leading only the last lap in the race. The last-lap contact also produced some of the most memorable broadcasting quotes in NASCAR history. After the race, Dick Berggren asked Earnhardt, "How will this affect your championship? You've got three more to go." Earnhardt responded, "What do ya think? They oughta fine that son of a bitch and make him sit out the rest of the year, I dunno." Earnhardt ended up losing the championship by 12 points to Wallace.

1990s: Start of decline
By the 1990s, North Wilkesboro was like a part of the past. Enoch had always had the fans' interests at heart, and he was reluctant to raise ticket and concession prices or charge spectators additional fees to make facility improvements. Track amenities were seen as out-of-date and lagging behind the other more modern facilities. Parking was overcrowded and tight, traffic jams plagued the two-lane roads leading to the facility, and hotel and motel rooms were hard to find in the area. NASCAR crowds and TV contracts had outgrown the Speedway. NASCAR had continued to expand and grow more in the economy. Bigger TV deals and larger coverage of the races and new, bigger sponsors were growing in the sport, as North Wilkesboro races continued with the lowest crowd capacity, 60,000 in its best years, in all of the Winston Cup Series. Winners purses were normally still under $100,000.

Controversy erupted at the end of the 1990 First Union 400. Mark Martin had started the race from the pole, and Darrell Waltrip was in the lead when a caution came out late for Kenny Wallace right as the last round of green flag pit stops was completed. Brett Bodine was on the tail-end of the lead lap. Since NASCAR didn't have electronic scoring until 1993, the pace car picked Brett Bodine up as the leader. The next 17 laps were run under the yellow, while the officials checked the lap charts and tried to sort everything out. By the time NASCAR realized its mistake and waved the rest of the field around the pace car to fall in behind race leader Bodine, Bodine had already pitted and gotten four fresh tires under yellow during all the confusion. Bodine was able to stay out front with the freshest tires. He led the rest of the race after the green came back out and picked up the win. Darrell Waltrip was very upset after the race and protested Bodine's win, but NASCAR declined the protest and Bodine kept the win. It turned out to be Bodine's only career win and Larry McReynolds' first oval track win as a crew chief after two road course victories with Ricky Rudd in the late 1980s. It was also the last  NASCAR Winston Cup Series win for Buick.

Dale Earnhardt dominated the 1990 Tyson Holly Farms 400, leading 291 laps. At one point, Earnhardt even passed Mark Martin for the lead down Pit Road to beat him out of the pits. No pit road speed limit was in place at the time. Kyle Petty had won the pole and led 64 laps early in the race. But in the end, Martin made a key adjustment on his last pit stop. He took off and ran away to gain the victory. Just hours after the race, rookie Rob Moroso was killed in a highway crash on the way home. Moroso became the only rookie to win the NASCAR Winston Cup Series Rookie of the Year honors posthumously.

In the 1991 First Union 400, Brett Bodine beat Alan Kulwicki for the pole. This was the first Winston Cup race held with a pit road speed limit. Dale Earnhardt spun early due to contact from Ricky Rudd, but he was able to make his way back to the front. Brett Bodine ran a very strong race and looked to be in contention for a second consecutive First Union 400 until he was spun in Turn Three by Ricky Rudd. Geoff Bodine was black-flagged for making contact with Davey Allison after the two had spun in Turn Four. Allison had escaped without damage in the first incident, but contact from Bodine after the caution damaged his right front fender. Jimmy Spencer seemed to have the car to beat, at one point leading 70 laps. Darrell Waltrip ended the long day in Victory Lane, winning his first race as a driver/owner since his early days in the 1970s. It was his 80th career win. This race had the record for most cautions in a Cup race at North Wilkesboro Speedway, with 17 cautions.

Harry Gant was looking to make history in the 1991 Tyson Holly Farms 400. After winning four straight Cup wins at Darlington, Richmond, Dover, and Martinsville, a win at North Wilkesboro would be a modern-era record of five straight wins in the Winston Cup Series. He had also won both Busch races that he had run in that period. Gant beat Davey Allison for the pole and also had a chance to earn the Unocal bonus, totaling $144,400, if he could win from the pole. Gant looked like he would get the record all day, staying out front and leading 350 laps until late in the race when he began experiencing brake problems. With nine laps to go, Dale Earnhardt passed Gant on the high side and went on to take the checkered flag. Gant still held on to a second-place finish, but his chance at making history was over.

In the 1992 First Union 400, Davey Allison beat Rusty Wallace and drove to victory with broken ribs. He had broken his ribs in a hard crash at Bristol the week before. Alan Kulwicki won the pole and led the most laps with 182. Davey Allison maintained his early Winston Cup Series season points lead.

The 1992 Tyson Holly Farms 400 was the last time a Winston Cup Series race went without a single caution flag on a track less than one mile in length. It was the last caution-free race until 1997 at Talladega. The race was run on a Monday after rain showers had postponed it on Sunday. Alan Kulwicki won the pole again, sweeping both poles at the track for the season. Geoffrey Bodine won the race that ended with only two drivers on the lead lap, Bodine and Terry Labonte. Bodine led 312 laps in the race driving the Number 15 Bud Moore Ford.

In the First Union 400 in 1994, Terry Labonte got his first Winston Cup Series win since 1989 and his first win driving for Rick Hendrick in the Number Five Kellogg Chevy. Ernie Irvan started from the pole with a track record speed of 119.016 mph and dominated most of the day, leading 320 laps in the 400-lap race before a pit stop miscue cost him the win. He was only able to make it back up to third position, and Labonte beat Rusty Wallace for the win.

The Tyson Holly Farms 400 that fall was a runaway for Geoffrey Bodine, who is the last Winston Cup Series driver to win by lapping the entire field. Jimmy Spencer started on the pole and led the first five laps. Bodine started 18th and cut through the field and into the top ten by lap five. Bodine led 334 out of 400 laps. This was the last win for Hoosier's tires in the Winston Cup Series; they withdrew from the series after NASCAR made new rules for the 1995 season with more requirements from tire companies.

Enoch Staley died of a stroke on May 22, 1995. Less than one month later, Speedway Motorsports, Inc. CEO Bruton Smith purchased fifty percent of the shares of the speedway from the Combs family. Smith had approached the Staley family prior to and after the death of Enoch in 1995. The family declined to sell to him because Enoch had distrusted Smith and had instructed the family never to sell the track to him. After this, it was decided that Smith and Mike Staley, Enoch's son, would have equal representation on the track. Mike Staley was installed as president and chief operating officer of the speedway for a one-year term.

The 1995 fall race weekend included the first NASCAR Supertruck race at the track and the return of Ernie Irvan to NASCAR Winston Cup Series racing. Irvan had not raced since his near fatal crash at Michigan in 1994. He made his first start in a truck on Saturday, starting on the outside front row. He led 24 laps before suspension problems forced him to pull out of the race just after the halfway break. Kenny Wallace, Jack Sprague, and Geoff Bodine all ran strong up front at some point, but Mike Bliss went on to score his first-ever truck win. On Sunday in the Tyson Holly Farms 400, Irvan, driving a Number 88 Robert Yates Racing Ford, started seventh and finished sixth with a 31-lap lead. Mark Martin picked up his second win at the track. This was the first Winston Cup Series race since 1959 with all the cars running at the finish. There were 28 lead changes in this race, a record for North Wilkesboro Cup races.

On January 1, 1996, the fifty-percent interest in North Wilkesboro Speedway owned by the Staley family was sold to racetrack developer and promoter Bob Bahre, owner of New Hampshire Motor Speedway. Mike Staley said that selling the track was very painful, but it was the only choice he had. Both Bahre and Bruton Smith already owned several NASCAR circuits. They announced their intent to use the spring and fall race dates for their own tracks, citing North Wilkesboro Speedway's age and lack of modern amenities. They said, "cash rules everything around us".

In the 1996 First Union 400, Terry Labonte won the pole, led the most laps, and won the race while tying Richard Petty's Iron-man streak of 513 consecutive starts. He also collected a bonus of $129,200 from the Unocal 76 Challenge Award for the race by winning from the pole. His car was painted silver to commemorate his record streak. The race attracted over 60,000 race fans. Many of them thought this would be the last race held at the Speedway since Bahre had enough time to organize a race at his New Hampshire International Speedway.

The 1996 Tyson Holly Farms 400 was the last NASCAR Winston Cup Series race held at the track. Junior Johnson refused to attend the last race weekend stating "I'm not going. It would be more of a sad deal for me to go out and just stand around and look at something disappear, something I can remember almost since I've been around." Bruton Smith needed extra security for the weekend for his own protection. Most of the hostile race fans viewed him as the reason for the track's closure. Ted Musgrave got the last pole with a lap speed of 118.054 mph. This was the last Cup race to have fewer than 40 cars start until the 2016 Folds of Honor QuikTrip 500 at Atlanta, where only 39 cars showed up. Eight drivers led laps in the race, with Jeff Gordon leading most of the event with 207 laps up front. Gordon won the race in front of a record crowd over runner-up Dale Earnhardt. Every car that started this race was running at the finish. Most of the fans remained in the stands long after the race was over, holding on to memories of the track.

The track was closed after the fall race of 1996. North Wilkesboro's spring date was moved to Smith's new Texas Motor Speedway. The fall date was taken over by Bahre's New Hampshire track and moved to early September as part of a schedule realignment.

2000s
In early 2003, Junior Johnson and a group of investors considered purchasing the speedway. Johnson speculated that the track could be used for all levels of NASCAR minor-league racing series. A driving school and a test track for the Winston Cup series were other proposed uses for the track. However, in 2004 due to disputes between the two owners, numerous repairs needed, and economic obstacles, Johnson deemed any track purchase highly unlikely.

In October 2003, local realtor Robert Glen started a petition to return racing to North Wilkesboro Speedway. Glen asserted that the speedway's absence was hurting the local economy. "People are losing their jobs, and they're losing their homes. You mention the speedway, and you see a glimmer of hope in their eyes. That racetrack is a crown jewel of Wilkes County . . . . this as a catalyst for bringing in new business and jobs to Wilkes." The petition asked county commissioners to condemn the Speedway and, through power of eminent domain, sell to an investor that would repurpose the facility for auto racing. There were 3,313 signatures on the petition. However, county officials decided condemnation of the property was not the best option.

During the fall of 2004, Roush Racing had its "Race for the Ride" testing session for its Roush Racing: Driver X television show. Twenty-six drivers, including Justin Allgaier, Erik Darnell, Matt McCall, Danny O'Quinn, and David Ragan, competed for a chance to earn a ride in the 2005 NASCAR Craftsman Truck Series. Roush asserted that North Wilkesboro Speedway would be a great place for testing young talent because "it's a driver's track" and because none of the drivers had ever raced there, everyone would have an equal shot.

Save The Speedway, a group founded in 2005 by Rob Marsden, began trying to bring racing back to North Wilkesboro Speedway. The group began a petition and caught the attention of current owners, Smith and Bahre. The track was valued by county tax assessors at $4.83 million. The owners eventually agreed to sell for $12 million. No sale was made. Save the Speedway spent the fall and winter of 2005 attempting to find a buyer or buyers for the track as well as proving that there was still interest in racing at the facility. Over a dozen touring series had written letters of intent to hold events should the Speedway be reopened. Three driving schools and several NASCAR teams showed interest in using the facility for testing. In 2006 Save The Speedway worked with a New York real estate developer in an attempt to rally investors, but parted ways when neither party could come to an agreement. 

In January 2007 during the NASCAR NEXTEL Cup Media Tour, Bruton Smith announced that he and co-owner Bob Bahre had agreed to let a real estate company attempt to sell the track for the asking price of $12 million. On September 28, 2007, Worth Mitchell, a land developer, announced plans to purchase the speedway. However, Worth Mitchell estimated his odds at 50–50 of completing the deal and the deal was never completed. On November 8, 2007, Bahre sold his share of North Wilkesboro Speedway to Smith as part of Smith's deal to buy Bahre's New Hampshire Motor Speedway.

Save the Speedway applied for a highway history marker. It was approved at the May meeting of the NC Highway Historical Marker Advisory Committee. North Carolina Office of Archives and History dedicated the placement of the marker on May 24, 2008, at 2:00 pm. The plaque reads:NORTH WILKESBORO SPEEDWAY

Pioneer NASCAR dirt track. Built 1946; paved in 1958. Hosted sanctioned events, 1949-96. 5/8 mile oval . W.On October 31, 2009, Jayski.com announced that the USAR Pro Cup Series would host an event at North Wilkesboro Speedway on October 3, 2010. Also in 2010, the track hosted the ASA Late Model Series for the King's Ransom 300 and the PASS Late Models. In 2009 it was announced that Save The Speedway would partner with Speedway Associates to work on the speedway during their lease. On January 7, 2010, the track announced that there would be a PASS Super Late Models race April 7–9, 2011, which would be a 300-lap race for $153,000 in winnings. They also announced that the Buck Baker Driving School would be the official driving school of NWS. The track announced sponsorship from Goodyear.

2010s
At the Labor Day Classic 200 on September 4, 2010 Chase Elliott, son of Bill Elliott, won his second PASS race of his career. This was the first race at the track since 1996. Chase led twice for a total of 69 laps in the 200-lap green flag event. Donnie and Bobby Allison returned to the track as Grand Marshalls for the event, which also held races for Stadium Stock, Limited Late Models, and Allison Legacy.

The Brushy Mountain 250 was the 12th USAR Pro Cup event of the 2010 season. The race was run on October 3, 2010. Jeff Agnew won the pole with a 110.996 mph lap. 20 cars started the event that was the first major race held at North Wilkesboro since the track was dropped from the Cup schedule after 1996. Jeff Agnew led 104 of the 250 laps and won the race over runner up Clay Rogers by 0.775 of a second. A modified race was also run at the event with Jason Myers winning.

The ASA Late Model Series ran the King's Ransom 300 on October 31, 2010. Jeff Choquette won the pole, but Kyle Beattie started on the pole for the 150-lap Kings Ransom event after a full-field inversion to start the race. Brian Ortiz beat Beattie to the lead and led the first 11 laps until Brent Downey caught and passed him on Lap 12. Choquette had flown through the field and eventually passed Downey for the lead on Lap 20. Choquette held the lead until the halfway break. Drivers came down Pit Road for a ten-minute break to make adjustments and get new tires for the second half of the race. The lineup for the second segment of the race had the top six cars inverted, putting Ortiz as the leader for the start of the second half. Ortiz led until Lap 107, when Choquette ran back up through the field and took the lead.  Choquette led the rest of the way to the victory, as Sean Bass and Tanner Berryhill came in second and third respectively. This was Choquette's third win in the last four Sunoco National Tour races. In the other races, Becca Kasten was black-flagged for jumping the final restart, giving the win to Matt McCall in the 150-lap Late Model Stock race. Justin Sorrow held off Gary Davis in a thrilling photo finish to win the 100-lap Limited Late Model race, and Wayne Harrington won the UCAR 40-lap race. The Short Track Shootout was held the day before with Cale Gale winning the Rolling Thunder Modifieds Series race. Alan Carter won the USST Super Trucks Series race, and Tyler Hill won the Allison Legacy Series race.

The 2011 season-opener, the Pro All Stars Series (PASS) South, presented by J. E. Pistons and Roush Yates Performance Products, "The Race" was the country's richest short-track race ever. Seventy-seven drivers showed up to try to make the 44-car field and try to win the $75,000 winner's purse. It was the first-ever race held under the lights at the track, but severe storms forced postponement of the race, which resulted in the race not ending under the lights. Qualifying, heat races, and a couple of last chance events were used to set the 44-car field. Drivers from 21 states and five Canadian provinces had showed up to try to make the field. On Friday, Stephen Nasse won the fast time with a new track record of 18.700 seconds. The fastest 15 during qualifying locked themselves into the field. The top ten drivers then had to redraw for their starting positions in the race. Five 25-lap heat races were run that evening, with the top three drivers in each race transferring into the race. On Saturday, two 40-lap last chance races were run, with only the winners transferring into the race. Ten provisionals were given from the PASS series, and Geoff Bodine and Sterling Marlin were added to the field as North Wilkesboro Speedway track provisionals. Before "The Race," a 100-lap modified race was run. Jimmy Zacharias dominated the first half of the event. Zacharias had a half-lap lead over the field by the first yellow flag on Lap 16. Jason Myers moved up and challenged Zacharias hard for the lead before the competition caution flew at halfway. After the teams made adjustments during the break, Zacharias and Jason Myers led the field to the green, when Zacharias again took off with the lead. On Lap 75, the yellow flag flew again, and all the leaders pitted to make final adjustments and set up for a 25-lap dash to the finish. Randy Butner and Gary Putnam led the field on the restart with Zacharias in the back after his pit stop. Junior Miller would soon take over the lead as Zacharias' car appeared to be losing grip after running hard to charge back up to the front. After a yellow on Lap 90, Zacharias and Jason Myers pitted for more adjustments. Miller took the restart and never looked back, taking the 100-lap Modified victory. The main race started with Johnny Clark and Jay Fogleman on the front row. Clark was able get out front and lead the first lap of the race. Andy Loden, Augie Grill, Bubba Pollard, and Jody Lavender led in the first segment of the race. An eight-minute break was given for teams to work on their cars and change four tires to prep them for the second segment. Pollard took the lead on the restart and continued to lead until just prior to the Lap 200 end-of-segment break, when Chris Eggleston worked his way to the lead. At the break, teams once again put four new tires on and made adjustments for the last segment. Pollard jumped to the lead quickly at the start of the last segment. With 50 laps remaining, Pollard and Eggleston ran hard-nose to tail through lapped traffic. On Lap 276, Pollard appeared to try to get under Clark off Turn Four and got sideways, allowing Eggleston to drive around on the high side and take the lead. Over the final laps of the caution-free segment, Eggleston was able to pull away from Pollard. At the end of 300 laps of racing, Eggleston took the checkered flag to win the historic event. Pollard had finished runner-up but was disqualified after post race technical inspection. Jeff Choquette was bumped up to second place, with T.J. Reaid, Ben Rowe, and Andy Loden filling out the top five. Other notable drivers in the field were Ryan Blaney (sixth), Ross Kenseth (seventh), Cale Gale (12th), Erik Darnell (18th), Geoff Bodine (36th), Kenzie Ruston (37th), Gray Gaulding (39th), and Sterling Marlin (43rd). However, after the April 2011 race at the Speedway, Save The Speedway said it would cease working with Speedway Associates and would no longer assist with the Speedway.

In December 2019, the track was cleared of weeds and debris that had grown in the track's surface since its closure in an effort to make its surface scannable by racing simulator iRacing. iRacing executive vice president Steve Myers credited former driver Dale Earnhardt Jr. for leading the movement to scan the track. In April 2020, NASCAR and iRacing announced that the North Wilkesboro Speedway track would be available for use on iRacing by June. Rumors surfaced in early May that the track could be ready for use by the eNASCAR iRacing Pro Invitational Series prior to its official release date, with confirmation coming during the Fox broadcast of the Pro Invitational event on Dover International Speedway. Due to popular demand, the track was made available to the public on May 11, 2020.

2020s: Renovation and NASCAR return
On November 18, 2021, North Carolina Governor Roy Cooper signed the 2021–2022 North Carolina state budget, which allocated $40 million for three race tracks: Charlotte Motor Speedway, Rockingham Speedway, and North Wilkesboro Speedway. The funding made the track financially viable to re-open according to Speedway Motorsports President and CEO Marcus Smith, "The allocation toward North Wilkesboro provides the starting capital needed to rebuild the infrastructure of the historic facility. With state budget amounts now finalized, we can zero in on project priorities and determine work schedules. The goal will be to modernize the property so that it can host racing and special events again in the future.”

During the annual Wilkes County Chamber of Commerce meeting, Smith revealed renderings of a modernized North Wilkesboro Speedway. When asked about what types of races would be held once the speedway was reopened, he stated at the time: "I don't see Cup racing happening in that market." He instead saw the track hosting Craftsman Truck Series events once it was reopened.

In April 2022, it was announced that the track would hold a series of races in August 2022 and October 2022 dubbed Racetrack Revival and featuring grassroots racing. The August races were held on the existing pavement, while the October races would've been held on the dirt after the pavement was removed for a planned 2023 re-pave of the facility. The October races would later be cancelled as the track found the conversion time between asphalt and dirt to be too limited for proper preparations.

Former NASCAR Cup Series star Ryan Newman won the first race of North Wilkesboro's Racetrack Revival, taking the checkered flag in the Uncatchable Moonshine 50 for Tour Type Modifieds. Newman took the lead from Spencer Davis with six laps to go, outlasting the dominant driver of the night to win the 50-lap feature. In addition, the CARS Tour ran the Window World 125 late model stock race on August 31 at the track, with Dale Earnhardt Jr. participating and Carson Kvapil winning.

On September 8, 2022, at the North Carolina History Museum in Raleigh, North Carolina, Speedway Motorsports announced that North Wilkesboro Speedway will host the 2023 NASCAR All-Star Race on May 21, 2023, as part of NASCAR's 75th anniversary celebrations bringing the NASCAR Cup Series back to the track for the first time since 1996. The NASCAR Craftsman Truck Series was later added to the weekend schedule bringing that series back to the speedway for the first time since 1996 as well.

Speedway Motorsports would announce on October 25, 2022, the addition of CRA Super Late Models, CARS Pro Late Models and Late Models would return for All Star week on May 16–17, 2023.

In popular culture
North Wilkesboro Speedway has been featured in several NASCAR-related video games, including NASCAR Racing, NASCAR Racing 2, NASCAR Racing 3, NASCAR Racing 4, NASCAR Racing 2003 Season, and NASCAR Heat as an add-on track that can be downloaded. It has also been featured in GeneRally and Top Gear (BBC) Series 16 Special Episode, "East Coast Road Trip".  North Wilkesboro Speedway, along with other dirt tracks such as Occoneechee Speedway, is one of the inspirations for the Thomasville Speedway in the Pixar movie Cars 3. North Wilkesboro Speedway was featured as the backdrop and story line on Travel Channel's Bizarre Foods with Andrew Zimmern in the episode entitled North Carolina's Moonshine Highway.

Records
Most NASCAR Cup Wins in Track History: 15 - Richard Petty
Most NASCAR Cup Poles in Track History: 9 - Darrell Waltrip
Most NASCAR Cup Top Fives in Track History: 33 - Richard Petty
Most NASCAR Cup Top Tens in Track History: 42 - Richard Petty
 The last time a winning driver totally lapped the field on the way to a win was October 1994, when Geoffrey Bodine won, completing 400 laps, while second place was Terry Labonte, who completed 399.
 The youngest driver ever to start a NASCAR Winston Cup Series race at age 17 was Bobby Hillin, Jr., who made his start on April 18, 1982, at the Northwestern Bank 400 at North Wilkesboro Speedway. This is no longer possible, as NASCAR, per request of the Master Settlement Agreement signed with the R. J. Reynolds Tobacco Company in 1998, was forced to mandate a minimum age of 18.
 Cale Yarborough was the first Cup driver to win a points-paying race on his birthday, March 27, 1977, at North Wilkesboro Speedway.

Past Cup winners

Multiple winners (drivers)

Multiple winners (owners)

Manufacturer wins

Past Busch Series winners

Past Truck Series winners

Past Convertible Series winners

Further reading
A. Baker, When the Engines No Longer Roar: A Case Study Of North Wilkesboro, N.C. And the North Wilkesboro Speedway, Ohio University, 2005. A thesis looking at the loss of North Wilkesboro Speedway.

References

External links

North Wilkesboro Speedway information at jayski.com

1947 establishments in North Carolina
Sports venues completed in 1947
Landmarks in North Carolina
Motorsport venues in North Carolina
NASCAR races at North Wilkesboro Speedway
NASCAR tracks
Buildings and structures in Wilkes County, North Carolina